Move Along is an album by The All-American Rejects

Move Along may also refer to:

Move Along, a 1926 short film starring Lloyd Hamilton that survives
Move Along (The Grass Roots album), a 1972 album by The Grass Roots, or the title song
"Move Along" (song), a song released in 2006 by The All-American Rejects
 "Move Along", a 2012 song by Lower Than Atlantis on their album Changing Tune